Electrographa thiolychna is a species of sedge moth, and the only species in the genus Electrographa. It was described by Edward Meyrick in 1912. It is found in Burma.

References

Moths described in 1912
Glyphipterigidae